This is the order of battle of the German, Greek and British Commonwealth units on 5 April 1941, prior to the German invasion of Greece and Yugoslavia ("Operation Marita"). The German invasion and conquest of mainland Greece is known as the "Battle of Greece".

German forces 
The German forces were grouped under Generalfeldmarschall Wilhelm List's 12th Army, which comprised:

 1st Panzer Group (Generaloberst Paul Ludwig Ewald von Kleist), deployed against central Yugoslavia (Serbia)
 XL Panzer Corps (Generalleutnant Georg Stumme), deployed against southern Yugoslavia (Vardar Macedonia)
9th Panzer Division
73rd Infantry Division
LSSAH Motorized Regiment
 XVIII Mountain Corps (General der Infanterie Franz Böhme), deployed against the Greek forces along the Metaxas Line
2nd Panzer Division
5th Mountain Division 
6th Mountain Division
72nd Infantry Division
Reinforced 125th Infantry Division
 XXX Army Corps (General der Artillerie Otto Hartmann)
50th Infantry Division
164th Infantry Division
 L Army Corps (General der Kavallerie Georg Lindemann), as reserve in Romania
 16th Panzer Division, on the Bulgarian–Turkish border

The 1st Panzer Group did not participate in any significant way in the conquest of Greece. After the unexpected coup d'état in Yugoslavia on 27 March, the objective of the Panzer Group was changed to invading Yugoslavia and capturing Zagreb. As such, its command was handed over to General Maximilian von Weichs' 2nd Army, which was invading Yugoslavia from the north.

Greek forces 

The Greek Army had been fighting against the Italians since 28 October 1940, and the bulk of its forces (15+ divisions) was still committed against the Italian Army and within Albania. The forces available to face the expected German attack in Macedonia were mostly newly formed divisions manned with reservists, lacking heavy weapons and equipment. At the same time, the Greek GHQ did not agree with the British as to the deployment of its forces, being unwilling to abandon all of northern Greece in favour of the shorter Vermion Mountains–Haliacmon River line favoured by the British. Consequently, the Greek forces in Macedonia were divided in two major groupings, which fought separate battles.

The Eastern Macedonia Army Section (Τμήμα Στρατιάς Ανατολικής Μακεδονίας, ΤΣΑΜ) under Lt. Gen. Konstantinos Bakopoulos covered the pre-war fortifications of the Metaxas Line, between Mount Beles and the Nestos river.
 7th Infantry Division (Maj. Gen. Christos Zoiopoulos)
 26th Infantry Regiment
 71st Infantry Regiment 
 92nd Infantry Regiment 
 14th Infantry Division (Maj. Gen. Konstantinos Papakonstantinou)
 18th Infantry Division (Maj. Gen. Leonidas Stergiopoulos)
 19th Mechanized Division (Maj. Gen. Nikolaos Lioumbas)
 191st Mechanized Regiment
 192nd Mechanized Regiment
 193rd Mechanized Regiment
 Nestos Brigade (Col. Anastasios Kalis)
 Krousia Detachment
 Evros Brigade (Maj. Gen. Ioannis Zisis), detached as a covering force for Western Thrace
 21 fortresses of the Meraxas Line

The Central Macedonia Army Section (Τμήμα Στρατιάς Κεντρικής Μακεδονίας, ΤΣΚΜ) under Lt. Gen. Ioannis Kotoulas was assigned to the 'W' Force in holding the Vermion Mountains–Haliacmon line:
 12th Infantry Division (Col. G. Karambatos)
 35th Infantry Regiment
 80th Infantry Regiment 
 Dodecanese Regiment
 X Frontier Sector 
 20th Mountain Artillery Regiment
 20th Infantry Division (Maj. Gen. Christos Karassos)
 82nd Infantry Regiment 
 84th Infantry Regiment 
 86th Infantry Regiment 
 87th Infantry Regiment

In total, the Greek forces facing the Germans numbered 65,110 men, only about half of whom were combat-worthy.

Commonwealth forces 
The Commonwealth forces were constituted as the "'W' Force", named after its commander, Lieutenant General Sir Henry Maitland Wilson:
 Australian Imperial Force (Lt. Gen. Sir Thomas Blamey)
 6th Australian Division (Maj. Gen. Sir Iven Mackay)
 16th Australian Infantry Brigade (Brig. Arthur Allen)
 17th Australian Infantry Brigade (Brig. Stanley Savige)
 19th Australian Infantry Brigade (Brig. George Vasey)
 2nd New Zealand Division (Maj. Gen. Bernard Freyberg)
 4th Infantry Brigade (Brig. Edward Puttick)
 5th Infantry Brigade (Brig. James Hargest)
 6th Infantry Brigade (Brig. Harold Barrowclough)
 British 1st Armoured Brigade (Brig. Harold Vincent Spencer Charrington)
 7th Medium Regiment, Royal Artillery
 64th (London) Medium Regiment, Royal Artillery
 2nd Heavy Anti-Aircraft Regiment, Royal Artillery
 106th (Lancashire Yeomanry) Light Anti-Aircraft Regiment, Royal Artillery

References

Sources 
 
 
 
 

Battle of Greece
Greece
History of the Hellenic Army